The National Winter Games of China are a nationwide Chinese winter sports competition typically held every 4 to 5 years in conjunction with the National Games of China.  The 2020 winter games, which were to take place in February in Inner Mongolia, have been postponed due to the global COVID-19 pandemic. No make-up date has been announced. 

The 2016 games featured 1,388 participants from 52 delegations, including Hong Kong and Macau.

Events
1959 - 1st National Winter Games, Jilin, Harbin
1965 - 2nd National Winter Games, -- (suspended)
1976 - 3rd National Winter Games, Harbin, Shangzhi
1979 - 4th National Winter Games, Shangzhi, Ürümqi, Beijing
1983 - 5th National Winter Games, Harbin, Yabuli
1987 - 6th National Winter Games, Changchun, Changbaishan
1991 - 7th National Winter Games, Harbin
1995 - 8th National Winter Games, Jilin
1999 - 9th National Winter Games, Changchun
2003 - 10th National Winter Games, Harbin, Yabuli
2008 - 11th National Winter Games, Jan 17 - Jan 27, 2008 in Qiqihar
2012 - 12th National Winter Games, Jan 1 - Jan 13 2012 in Changchun
2016 - 13th Chinese National Winter Games, Jan 20 - Jan 30, 2016 in Ürümqi, Xinjiang
2024 - 14th Chinese National Winter Games, originally scheduled to be held from Feb 16 - Feb 26, 2020 in Hailar and Yakeshi, Inner Mongolia Autonomous Region -- postponed to 2024

References

China Winter
National Games of China
Recurring sporting events established in 1959
China
1959 establishments in China
Multi-sport events in China
Winter sports competitions in China